Frecheville Comprehensive School was a secondary school located in Frecheville, South Yorkshire, England. When built, the school was in Derbyshire, but became a Sheffield city school following a boundary change in 1967. The school opened in 1936, merged with the nearby Thornbridge School, now The Birley Academy, in 1986, and closed permanently in 1987. The site is now a housing estate.

Notable alumni
Simon Beckett, author.
Joanne Catherall, musician and member of synth-pop band The Human League. Attended the school between 1974 and 1979.
Geoff Dey, Sheffield United and Scunthorpe United football player.
Steve Faulkner, Sheffield United football player.
Wayne Furniss, musician and early member of rock band Pulp.
Mark Pearson, Manchester United, Sheffield Wednesday, Fulham and Halifax Town football player
Ian Reddington, musician and actor. Played Vernon Tomlin in the ITV soap opera Coronation Street.
Susan Ann Sulley, musician and member of synth-pop band The Human League, attended the school between 1974 and 1979.
Neil Warnock, football manager and player
Alan Woodward, Sheffield United football player.
Rodger Wylde, Sheffield Wednesday, Oldham Athletic, Sporting CP, Sunderland, Barnsley and Stockport County football player

Notable former teachers 

 Veronica Hardstaff, Labour MEP from 1994 to 1999 for Lincolnshire and Humberside South, and married to Alan Billings, the South Yorkshire Police and Crime Commissioner since 2016, taught German from 1979 until the school's closure in 1986.
Alan Farmer, historian and history teacher, and Hhead of Sixth Form in the 1970s, wrote dozens of definitive history text books, with a special interest in the United States Civil War.

Film and television 
The BBC TV children's programme, The Best in Football, with the football legend George Best, was filmed on Frecheville School's playing fields in c.1971.

References

Defunct schools in Sheffield
The Human League